The Plaza Hotel & Casino is a casino–hotel located in downtown Las Vegas, Nevada owned by the Tamares Group, and PlayLV is the leaseholder and operator of the property. The Plaza also features a classic showroom, seasonal roof top swimming pool, fitness center, downtown's only bingo room, and a race and sports book.

The Plaza began an extensive $35 million renovation project at the end of 2010 that included brand new guestrooms and suites, an entirely remodeled casino floor and lobby, and all new restaurants, bars and entertainment options. The renovations utilize contemporary furnishings and materials purchased from the Fontainebleau Resort after it suspended construction on the Las Vegas Strip. The hotel and the full casino reopened on 1 September 2011. The property has undertaken numerous other renovation projects in the years since to further enhance the guest experience, including a McDonald’s and Mexican fajita stand.

History

Las Vegas Union Pacific Station 

Prior to the construction of the casino, part of the site was used for the first train station in Las Vegas, a Spanish style depot, constructed in 1906. Union Pacific replaced that station in 1940 with a Streamline Moderne train station designed by H. L. Gogerty, with a Union Pacific shield, and "Streamliners & Challengers" neon sign.  This station was demolished in 1970. The casino -- originally named Union Plaza, in reference to the railroad station that originally stood at the site -- included a small waiting room to be used as a station for Amtrak trains.

Union Plaza Hotel and Casino
Upland Industries, the Union Pacific's real estate division, and developer Frank E. Scott built the Union Plaza complex on the station site. The hotel opened at 10 AM on July 1, 1971; the casino opened at midnight following and was managed by a team of local casino execs that included Sam Boyd, Jackie Gaughan, JK Houssels Jr, and Bill Boyd. With 500 rooms when it opened, it was advertised as the largest hotel and casino in the world.

Before the discontinuation of the Desert Wind train route on 10 May 1997, Amtrak made its Las Vegas, Nevada station near the Plaza. The station and ticket windows were directly connected to the hotel. It was the only train station in the United States located in a casino. The Greyhound Bus station for Las Vegas was also located at the ground floor of the Plaza since opening, until hotel management terminated their lease. The station moved out February 23, 2021.

Plaza Hotel & Casino
Barrick Gaming Corporation acquired the Plaza from Jackie Gaughan and in late 2005 later ceded operation to majority owner Tamares Group. On 1 July 2005 after Tamares took control of the Plaza, Las Vegas mayor Oscar Goodman made his opinions clear: "If I had my druthers, I would like to have somebody in place to discuss imploding the Plaza." He was referring to his desire to see the Plaza replaced with new construction that would create a scenic entrance to Union Park.

During its ownership by Barrick Gaming Corporation, D.W. Barrick's good friend, Larry Manetti (who played Orville "Rick" Wright on the television show Magnum, P.I.) hosted a celebrity brunch every Sunday, featuring such guests as Pat Morita and Steve Rossi. He also owned Manetti's in the Plaza. When Barrick sold its interest in the hotel to the Tamares Group, Manetti closed his restaurant and severed his relationship with the hotel. The Plaza's famed glass dome is now the home of the award-winning Oscar's Steakhouse, which opened in 2011 and is named after and influenced by Oscar Goodman.

The hotel closed for renovations on 11 November 2010, and acquired furniture, carpets and fixtures from the bankrupt Fontainebleau Resort Las Vegas project on the Strip. From November, 2010 to August, 2011, the Plaza still operated its sports & racebook, showroom, one bar, and a portion of the casino. By March 2011, the south tower had been renovated, and the casino finished renovations and re-opened on August 24, 2011. The hotel officially re-opened for business on September 1, 2011.

In 2014, the Plaza announced that a new 3,500-seat facility would be constructed at the hotel to become the new home arena for the Las Vegas Wranglers minor league hockey team of the ECHL. However, the hockey team suspended operations for the 2014-15 season and would eventually fold mid-season.

The property has undertaken numerous other renovations and amenity enhancement projects since 2011. In 2016, the Plaza fully refurbished its rooftop pool creating a "retro Palm Springs meets classic downtown Las Vegas" inspired outdoor space with a wet deck, hot tub, private cabanas, bar and food truck. With 12 Pickleball courts, the Plaza is the only hotel/casino in Las Vegas with so many courts dedicated to the sport.  As a result, it hosts the Las Vegas Pickleball Open each September.

The Plaza also has the Core Arena, the first and only equestrian center in downtown Las Vegas, with 80 equine stalls for year-round use.

In 2019, a $15 million renovation created 100-plus fully renovated Luxe guest rooms and suites on the top floors of the North Tower, offering premium guest accommodations with high end decor, energy efficiency and technology upgrades, including Amazon Echo Dots.

Reflecting the growing influence of public art in downtown Las Vegas, the Plaza boasts three 21-story murals by artists, Shepard Fairey, D*Face and Faile on its North Tower.

In popular culture

Film
In the 1971 James Bond film Diamonds Are Forever, the construction of the Union Plaza is visible as Bond evades the attention of the police department.
In the television series "Vega$" (1978-1981), starring Robert Urich and filmed entirely in Las Vegas, the Union Plaza is featured prominently in both the opening montage and the closing credits. 
In the 1989 film, Back to the Future Part II, Biff Tannen's Pleasure Paradise Casino Hotel is based on the structure of neon lights & signs of this hotel.
The Union Plaza played a major role in the 1992 movie Cool World.
The Union Plaza is visible as giant baby Adam walks through downtown Las Vegas in 1992 movie Honey, I Blew Up the Kid.
In the 1994 movie version of The Stand, the Union Plaza played a key role as the headquarters of Randall Flagg.
 In the 1995 movie Casino, a scene starring Robert De Niro and Sharon Stone plays inside the Center Stage Restaurant, where Ginger (played by Sharon Stone) and Sam (played by Robert De Niro) argue over missing money.
In the 2000 movie Pay It Forward, a scene starring Kevin Spacey plays inside the Center Stage Restaurant.
In the 2001 movie The Mexican, Samantha and Winston stay at the Plaza, and Frank is killed by being thrown from one of its balconies.
In the 2003 movie Looney Tunes: Back in Action, the Plaza serves as the hotel tower for "Yosemite Sam's Wooden Nickel" casino.
In the 2004 movie The Girl Next Door, desperate to win her back, Matt (Emile Hirsch) and his friends follow Danielle (Elisha Cuthbert) to Las Vegas and find her performing at a convention, which appears to be taking place at the Plaza.
In the 2008 film The Grand, the Plaza serves as the hotel tower for "The Rabbit's Foot".
The Union Plaza played a major role in the 2008 film Yonkers Joe.
The Plaza is briefly shown in some scenes of the 2013 movie The Hangover Part 3.

Television
The syndicated Ultimate Poker Challenge has been taped at the Plaza as well as the currently-running National Wrestling Alliance program NWA Wrestling Showcase, airing on Colours TV.

CBS finished production early in 2010 of a show called The Odds that was to take place at the Plaza Hotel as well as along the Fremont Street Experience starring Donald Faison.

In a 1991 episode of Murder She Wrote - A Killing in Vegas, the Plaza Hotel can be seen in two scenes.  The first is where Jessica is seen coming out of the Hotel she is staying at and the Lobby Entrance Canopy lights can clearly been seen.  The second is just before the victim gets murdered and the scene shows a quick glimpse of Fremont Street from the Pioneer looking up the street towards the Plaza at the top of the road (the name Plaza can clearly be seen.)

Music videos 
The Plaza is featured in many scenes of the video "We Built This City" by Starship, despite the fact that the song refers to an 80s Los Angeles, San Francisco, Cleveland, and New York City, but not Las Vegas.
The Plaza was briefly shown in Pink Floyd's screen video for "Money".
The Plaza was featured prominently in Mase's "Feels So Good" video.
Mase's video was parodied by Monster Magnet, which was filmed in front of the Plaza as well.
The front of the Plaza is shown in Lil Wayne's music video for "No Worries".
Some scenes of Iggy Azalea's "Change Your Life" music video were shot at The Plaza.
 Some scenes from The Killers 2017 music video for "The Man" were filmed at The Plaza.
Portions of The Weeknd's music video for "Heartless" were filmed at The Plaza.

Gambling history
On April 11, 2004, Ashley Revell, 32, of Kent, England, sold all his possessions and traveled to the Plaza to bet his life savings of $135,300 on one spin of the roulette wheel. He won, and doubled his money.

References

External links

Casinos in the Las Vegas Valley
Downtown Las Vegas
Skyscraper hotels in Las Vegas
Hotels established in 1971
Hotel buildings completed in 1971
Casino hotels
1971 establishments in Nevada